The list of parties to the Convention on the Elimination of All Forms of Discrimination Against Women encompasses the states who have signed and ratified or acceded to the international agreement to prevent discrimination against women.

On December 18, 1979, the Convention on the Elimination of All Forms of Discrimination Against Women  was opened for signature. Sweden became the first state to deposit the treaty on July 2, 1980. The treaty came into force and closed for signature on September 3, 1981 with the ratification of 20 states. Since then, states that did not sign the treaty can now only accede to it. The instrument of ratification, accession, or succession is deposited with the Secretary-General of the United Nations.

As of May 2015, 189 states have ratified or acceded to the treaty, most recently South Sudan on April 30, 2015. In addition, the United States and Palau have signed but not ratified the treaty. The Republic of China (Taiwan) has also ratified the treaty in its legislature, but is unrecognized by the United Nations and is a party to the treaty only unofficially.

Ratified or acceded states

Unrecognized states that abide by the treaty

States that have signed but not ratified the treaty

Non-signatory states

Note

References

Lists of parties to treaties
Convention Against Discrimination